33rd Street station is a subway station in Philadelphia. It is located on the campus of Drexel University and serves all routes of the SEPTA subway–surface trolley lines. It is the last station of the subway–surface lines with all lines before the Route 10 splits away and exits the tunnel at 36th Street. The stop is located on the campus of Drexel University.

History 

The station was opened in November 1955 by the Philadelphia Transportation Company (PTC) as part of a larger project to move portions of the elevated Market Street Line and surface trolleys underground. The original project to bury the elevated tracks between 23rd to 46th streets was announced by the PTC's predecessor, the Philadelphia Rapid Transit Company, in the 1920s, but was delayed due to the Great Depression and World War II. The PTC's revised project also included a new subway–surface tunnel for subway–surface trolleys underneath the campus of the University of Pennsylvania, continuing from the original western portal at 23rd and Market streets to new portals at 36th and Ludlow streets for Route 10 and 40th Street and Baltimore Avenue for other routes.

On April 11, 1988, a trolley derailed at the station, injuring 27 people.

Station layout 
The station has two low-level side platforms, each capable of platforming two trolleys at a time. Fares are collected manually on board trolleys.

References

External links 

Images at NYCSubway.org

SEPTA Subway–Surface Trolley Line stations
Railway stations in Philadelphia
Railway stations in Pennsylvania at university and college campuses
Railway stations located underground in Pennsylvania